Moyen-Comoé Region is a defunct region of Ivory Coast. From 1997 to 2011, it was a first-level subdivision region. The region's capital was Abengourou and its area was 6,921 km2. Since 2011, the area formerly encompassed by the region is the second-level Indénié-Djuablin Region in Comoé District.

Administrative divisions
At the time of its dissolution, Moyen-Comoé Region was divided into three departments: Abengourou, Agnibilékrou, and Bettié.

Abolition
Moyen-Comoé Region was abolished as part of the 2011 administrative reorganisation of the subdivisions of Ivory Coast. The area formerly encompassed by the region is now Indénié-Djuablin Region. Indénié-Djuablin is one of two regions in the first-level Comoé District.

References

Former regions of Ivory Coast
States and territories disestablished in 2011
2011 disestablishments in Ivory Coast
Indénié-Djuablin
1997 establishments in Ivory Coast
States and territories established in 1997